Stablemates is a jazz composition by American saxophonist Benny Golson written in 1955. The song was first recorded by Miles Davis in Miles: The New Miles Davis Quintet, released in 1956. It is widely regarded as a jazz standard and has been recorded by many notable jazz artists.

Background 

According to his autobiography, Golson wrote Stablemates while on the road with Earl Bostic in Wilmington, Delaware. His soon-to-be ex-wife was present with her friends, and he told her during intermission that he was busy with a "very important assignment" due the following morning. He wrote the first 14 bars of the song on the bandstand, and he initially thought the song was "demented". In the coming two days he spent on tour, he took those respective intermissions to write the song on the bandstand.

When Golson originally wrote the song, the chord for the first measure was a B-flat augmented chord. When Miles Davis recorded it, he changed that measure to accommodate two chords, an E minor seventh for the first two beats, and an A seventh for the third and fourth, which had Golson dismayed.

Musical composition 
The tune follows an ABA form. Written in D-flat major, the A sections are 14 bars each, while the bridge is 8 bars, for a total of 36 bars.

Notable recordings 

 Miles Davis in Miles: The New Miles Davis Quintet (1956)
 Dizzy Gillespie in Dizzy in Greece (1957)
 Jackie McLean in Swing, Swang, Swingin' (1960)

References 

1950s jazz standards
Jazz standards
Jazz compositions in D-flat major
Benny Golson songs